Nadole is a settlement in the Municipality of Žetale in eastern Slovenia. It lies in the Haloze Hills and is made up of a number of smaller dispersed hamlets: Jesenice, Kofirt, Ložec, Marija Vas, Menik, Nadola, Pušjek, Rodni Dol, Sep, Strmec, Topole, Tomanje, Višnjavec, Zagaj, Zalopata, and Zlaka. The area traditionally belonged to the Styria region. It is now included in the Drava Statistical Region.

References

External links
Nadole on Geopedia

Populated places in the Municipality of Žetale